John Bayne Breckinridge (November 29, 1913 – July 29, 1979) was an American politician, a Democrat who served as Attorney General of Kentucky twice and also served as a member of the United States House of Representatives from Kentucky.

Early life
Breckinridge was born in the District of Columbia on November 29, 1913. His father was Dr. Scott Dudley Breckinridge Sr. and his mother was Gertrude Ashby (née Bayne) Breckinridge. His father was an fencer who competed in the 1912 Summer Olympics, and was a gynecologist in Lexington.

Breckinridge hailed from the Breckinridge family. His grandfather was major general Joseph Cabell Breckinridge Sr. and among his uncles were Joseph Cabell Breckinridge Jr., an officer in the United States Navy during the Spanish–American War, and Henry Skillman Breckinridge, who served as the United States Assistant Secretary of War under President Woodrow Wilson. He was the great-great-grandson of John Breckinridge, who had served as the second Attorney General of Kentucky and in the Kentucky House of Representatives and who also served as a member of the United States Senate and as Attorney General of the United States. John B. Breckinridge was also the great-nephew of William Campbell Preston Breckinridge who also represented Kentucky in the United States House of Representatives.

He received his bachelors and law degrees from the University of Kentucky. He was admitted to the Kentucky Bar in 1940 and practiced law in Lexington, Kentucky. He worked in the Anti-Trust Division of the United States Department of Justice in 1940-1941. He Served in the United States Army from April 18, 1941 to October 30, 1946 during World War II, rising to the rank of lieutenant colonel.

Political career
Breckinridge was twice elected to the Kentucky House of Representatives and served there from 1956 to 1960.

Breckinridge was elected Attorney General of Kentucky in 1959 when Bert T. Combs led the Democratic ticket to victory. He served his first term in that office in 1960–1964. In that first term Breckinridge served on the National Conference of Commissioners on Uniform State Law and was a delegate to the Democratic National Convention in 1960. Under state law at that time Breckinridge could not run for a second consecutive term as attorney general. He ran that year for Lieutenant Governor of Kentucky but lost in the Democratic primary to Harry Lee Waterfield. After that defeat Breckinridge returned to his law practice and began planning for a return to public office.

Breckinridge was elected to a second, non-consecutive term as Attorney General of Kentucky in 1967. Breckinridge won the office although the Republican ticket, led by Louie B. Nunn, won the governorship and the office of secretary of state.  Breckinridge served his second term as Attorney General of Kentucky from 1968 to 1972.  As his second term wound down, Breckinridge again ran for lieutenant governor in 1971 but lost again in the Democratic primary, this time to the Speaker of the Kentucky House of Representatives Julian Carroll.

In 1972 Breckinridge was elected to the United States House of Representatives from Kentucky's Sixth Congressional District (Lexington and the central Bluegrass). He defeated Republican Laban P. Jackson for the seat. He was re-elected in 1974 and 1976 and served in the House from January 3, 1973, through January 3, 1979.  Breckinridge ran for a fourth term in the House in 1978 but was defeated in the Democratic primary by Tom Easterly, who in turn lost the seat to Republican Larry Hopkins.

After his defeat Breckinridge returned to the practice of law in Lexington, Kentucky, where he died less than a year later on July 29, 1979.  His ashes were interred at Lexington Cemetery.

Legacy
As a member of the Kentucky House of Representatives and the United States House of Representatives, Breckinridge was regarded as an independent moderate.

See also
 List of members of the American Legion

References

External links

1913 births
1979 deaths
Kentucky Attorneys General
Democratic Party members of the Kentucky House of Representatives
American prosecutors
University of Kentucky alumni
Breckinridge family
Democratic Party members of the United States House of Representatives from Kentucky
20th-century American lawyers
20th-century American politicians
United States Army officers